Roy Estrada (also known as "Roy Ralph Moleman Guacamole Guadalupe Hidalgo Estrada" and "Orejón"; born April 17, 1943) is an American former musician and convicted sex offender. He is best known for his bass guitar work with Frank Zappa and the Mothers of Invention; for having been a founding member of Little Feat, playing on their first two studio albums; and for being a member of Captain Beefheart's the Magic Band.

Estrada is currently incarcerated in the Texas State Prison System. He was convicted for sex offenses, first having been convicted of child sex abuse in 1994 and serving six years' imprisonment, then pleading guilty to abuse of a young relative in 2012. He will not be eligible for release until 2036, at which time he will be 93 years old.

Career

With drummer Jimmy Carl Black and vocalist Ray Collins, Estrada was an original member of Frank Zappa's Mothers of Invention. Previously, Estrada had been a founding member of the Soul Giants, the band from which the Mothers of Invention was formed. In addition to playing bass guitar, Estrada sang vocals—often in a falsetto in Zappa's arrangement of doo-wop harmonies. On the 1969 album studio Uncle Meat, for example, he was credited with bass guitar and "Pachuco falsetto."

Prior to the Soul Giants, Estrada fronted a band called Roy Estrada and the Rocketeers. The group released at least one single on the King label, "Jungle Dreams (Part 1)" backed with "Jungle Dreams (Part 2)".

In addition to his work with Zappa, Estrada formed Little Feat with Lowell George, Richie Hayward and Bill Payne in 1969, playing bass and singing backing vocals on their first two studio albums before quitting in 1972 to join Captain Beefheart's Magic Band. Beefheart gave him the nickname "Orejón" ('big ears'). Estrada returned to Zappa's band for a tour that ran from September 1975 to March 1976. The posthumous Zappa archival release Joe's Camouflage featured pre-tour rehearsal recordings, while recordings from the tour appeared on the archival releases FZ:OZ, Joe's Menage and Zappa ’75: Zagreb/Ljubljana. Zappa's 1976 studio album Zoot Allures included one track from the tour as well as studio recordings with Estrada on backing vocals. Estrada later provided vocals and acting for Zappa's 1979 film Baby Snakes, and vocal work for the 1980s Zappa studio albums Ship Arriving Too Late to Save a Drowning Witch, The Man from Utopia and Them or Us.

Session work
Estrada has also done session work by playing bass for a diverse range of artists, including Ry Cooder on his eponymous debut studio album, Ivan Ulz, Leo Kottke, Van Dyke Parks and Howdy Moon.

Grande Mothers
In 2002, two years after his release from jail, Estrada joined forces with fellow former Mothers Don Preston and Napoleon Murphy Brock, along with guitarist Ken Rosser and drummer and percussionist Christopher Garcia, to form "The Grande Mothers", the only Mothers of Invention/Frank Zappa alumni consistently performing the music of Zappa since 2002, with over 90 performances.

Since then they have performed at numerous concerts and festivals throughout the United States, Canada and Europe, including Austria, Belgium, Croatia, Czech Republic, Denmark, the UK, Germany, the Netherlands, Italy, Norway and Switzerland. In 2005, guitarist Miroslav Tadić replaced Ken Rosser in the line-up. Robbie "Seahag" Mangano has been the guitarist for all of the European Grande Mothers' tours since 2009.

In 2003 Estrada was featured on the album Hamburger Midnight (taking its title from a George/Estrada co-composition on the first Little Feat studio album) on the record label Inkanish Records, on which he collaborated once again with Jimmy Carl Black.

Sex offender status
Estrada served six years in prison after he was convicted of committing lewd acts with a child in Orange County, California, in December 1994. In January 2012, he pleaded guilty to a charge of continuous sexual abuse of a female family member younger than 14 which happened in March 2008. In the plea bargain agreement, he was sentenced to 25 years in prison and is not eligible for parole.

References

External links

 
 
 

1943 births
Living people
Hispanic and Latino American musicians
People from Santa Ana, California
Singer-songwriters from California
Criminals from California
American rock singers
Little Feat members
The Mothers of Invention members
The Magic Band members
American people convicted of child sexual abuse
American rock bass guitarists
American male singer-songwriters
Record producers from California
American rock songwriters
American session musicians
American male actors
American musicians of Mexican descent
Mexican-guitarron players
Guitarists from California
American funk bass guitarists
American male bass guitarists
American jazz bass guitarists
American rhythm and blues bass guitarists
20th-century American bass guitarists
American male jazz musicians
Jazz musicians from California